Victor "Macho" Harris, Jr. (born February 16, 1986) is a former Canadian football defensive back. He recently played for the Winnipeg Blue Bombers of the Canadian Football League (CFL). He played college football at Virginia Tech and was drafted by the Philadelphia Eagles in the fifth round of the 2009 NFL Draft. Harris went on to play for the Washington Redskins and the Pittsburgh Steelers before signing with the Saskatchewan Roughriders on April 18, 2012.

Early years
Victor "Macho" Harris earned All-District, All-Region, All-Metro, All-State, Parade All-American, and U.S Army All-American Honors while playing Running Back, Kick Returner, Punt Returner, and Safety at Highland Springs High School in Highland Springs, Virginia. In his Junior year, Harris rushed for 2,346 yards and 27 touchdowns and finished his high school career as the central regions career leader in rushing yards at that time. Harris was rated the #1 High School football player coming out of Virginia in 2005.

College career
Harris started as the Virginia Tech Hokies' number one cornerback, playing the boundary position. During his junior year, he was a first-team all-ACC selection. He had five career touchdowns with Virginia Tech: a 72-yard interception return against Cincinnati in 2006, a 100-yard kickoff return against Clemson, an interception return against East Carolina University in 2007 as well as interception returns against Boston College and Duke in 2008. Harris had a total of 15 career interceptions during his career at Virginia Tech. He previously had announced his intentions to leave early and enter the 2008 NFL Draft, but subsequently changed his mind and returned for his senior season.

Professional career

Pre-draft
At the 2009 NFL Scouting Combine, Harris recorded 3.98 seconds in the 20-yard shuttle, and 6.68 seconds in the 3 cone drill. His time in the 20-yard shuttle was the second best among cornerbacks, and his time in the 3 cone drill tied for second.

Philadelphia Eagles

2009 season
Harris was drafted by the Philadelphia Eagles in the fifth round (157th overall) of the 2009 NFL Draft. He opened the 2009 NFL regular season as the starting free safety, beating out Quintin Demps for the job. He was eventually replaced in the starting lineup by Sean Jones. However, the two split the majority of the playing time, and Harris eventually took back the starting position for final two games of the season: against the Dallas Cowboys in Week 17 and in the NFC Wild Card Round playoff game.

2010 season
Because Sean Jones was not re-signed in the offseason, Harris was projected to compete for the starting free safety job with Marlin Jackson, Quintin Demps, and rookie Nate Allen. For the team's preseason mini-camps, however, he took snaps from the cornerback position, the position he played in college. Due to the performance of rookie cornerback Trevard Lindley in the first three preseason games, Harris was switched back to free safety. Harris was waived on September 4.

Washington Redskins
Harris was signed by the Washington Redskins on November 23, 2010. After playing in three games in 2010, he was waived on July 30, 2011.

Pittsburgh Steelers
On August 17, 2011, Harris signed with the Pittsburgh Steelers. He waived for final cuts on September 2, 2011.

Saskatchewan Roughriders
Harris signed with the Saskatchewan Roughriders of the Canadian Football League on April 19, 2012. He was released during final cuts on June 24, 2012. Nevertheless, Harris returned to the Riders roster for the 2012 season, recording 7 tackles in 2 games. Harris saw more playing time in his second season in the CFL, collecting 23 tackles and his first career interception. Macho Harris started 16 of 18 regular-season games at defensive back for the Roughriders in 2014, posting a career best 61 tackles, 2 sacks, and 1 fumble recovery. On March 23, 2015, the Riders announced they had signed Harris to a contract extension.

In Week 14 of the 2015 CFL Season, Harris had arguably the greatest game of his CFL career, recording 3 interceptions (including a 50-yard pick six) while also recording 3 tackles in a Roughrider win over the Alouettes. Harris's 3 interceptions tied a Roughrider record for the most interceptions in a game.

Personal
Macho is the son of Victor Harris and the late Maritza Harris. He lives in Regina, Saskatchewan with his wife Kylie Harris and they recently had a baby girl named Kamila Harris. His father gave him the nickname "Macho" at the age of 2.

References

External links
 Philadelphia Eagles bio
 Saskatchewan Roughriders bio 
 Virginia Tech Hokies football bio
 Macho Harris going pro
 

1986 births
Living people
People from Highland Springs, Virginia
Players of American football from Virginia
American football safeties
American football cornerbacks
Canadian football defensive backs
African-American players of American football
African-American players of Canadian football
Virginia Tech Hokies football players
Philadelphia Eagles players
Washington Redskins players
Pittsburgh Steelers players
Saskatchewan Roughriders players
Winnipeg Blue Bombers players
21st-century African-American sportspeople
20th-century African-American people